WHIR (1230 AM) is a radio station  broadcasting a News Talk Information format. Licensed to Danville, Kentucky, United States.  The station is currently owned by Hometown Broadcastng of Danville Inc. WHIR features The Joe Mathis Show which can be heard Monday through Friday from 6-9 am. Sean Hannity, Dave Ramsey, and other nationwide syndicated shows are also carried, along with area and local sporting events.

References

External links

HIR
Radio stations established in 1947
News and talk radio stations in the United States